Richard Breutner (born 10 September 1979) is a German fencer. He competed in the individual and team foil events at the 2000 Summer Olympics. He won a silver medal in the men's team foil event at the 2006 World Fencing Championships.

References

External links
 

1979 births
Living people
German male fencers
Olympic fencers of Germany
Fencers at the 2000 Summer Olympics
Sportspeople from Johannesburg
German people of South African descent
20th-century German people